Pelawatte also spelled Pelawatta is a part of Battaramulla main town which is a suburb of Colombo located near to the new Parliament of Sri Lanka.

The Ministry of Education 'Isurupaya', the Department of Examination are located in Pelawatte and the Independent Television Network (ITN) television broadcasting station are also located in the vicinity of Pelawatte.

It also contains the only church in the world of Saint John dal Bastone.

Schools 
 Overseas School of Colombo 
 Vidyawardena Maha Vidyalaya

Populated places in Western Province, Sri Lanka